The 26th Artistic Gymnastics World Championships were held in Indianapolis, United States, in the Hoosier Dome from September 6 to 15, 1991. This was the last championships at which the Soviet Union competed.

Results

Men

Team Final

All-around

Floor Exercise

Pommel Horse

Rings

Vault

Parallel Bars

Horizontal Bar

Women

Team Final

All-around

Vault Final

Uneven Bars

Balance Beam

Floor Exercise

Medals

Overall

Men

Women

References
Gymn Forum: World Championships Results
Gymnastics

World Artistic Gymnastics Championships
International gymnastics competitions hosted by the United States
G
W
Sports competitions in Indianapolis
Gymnastics in Indiana